Terrebonne is an off-island suburb of Montreal, in southwestern Quebec, Canada. It is located in the North Shore region of the Montreal area, north of Laval across the Rivière des Mille-Îles.

This city is divided in three sectors, namely Lachenaie, La Plaine and Terrebonne. In the past, these sectors were distinct cities, but, on 22 August 2001, they merged under the name of Terrebonne. According to the 2021 Canadian Census Terrebonne has a population of 119,944, making it Montreal's third largest suburb and the largest city on the North Shore.

History

The town of Lachenaie, which was founded in 1683 by Lord Charles Aubert de Lachenaye, is the oldest of the three towns that were merged. Some natives were already present on this territory at the time. The colonisation really started in 1647 when Lachenaie was merged with the Repentigny Seigniory. Louis Lepage de Ste-Claire, priest, canon, and the son of René Lepage de Sainte-Claire, acquired the Seigniory of Terrebonne on 2 September 1720. Abbot Louis Lepage de Ste-Claire built the first church in 1734 and the first manor in 1735. A few years later, Abbot Lepage equipped the town with both a saw mill and a flour mill.

The town of La Plaine was founded in 1830 on fragments of other towns, namely Mascouche, Sainte-Anne-des-Plaines, Saint-Lin, and Terrebonne. At that time, the lords of Terrebonne and Lachenaie built the road named "chemin de la Grande Ligne" to join the two towns. It is now called the boulevard Laurier. In 1877, the rail system was developed and stimulated the economic growth. The village of Saint-Joachim was founded during that time, which was later, in 1920, to be renamed La Plaine.

The first lord of Terrebonne was André Daulier-Deslandes, who was granted his title in 1673. Following the construction of the first wooden bridge in 1834, two main areas emerged. The commercial area was Terrebonne, while the agricultural one was Saint-Louis de Terrebonne. In 1985, these two cities merged.

At the time of the municipal merger in late August 2001, Lachenaie had over 20,000 residents, La Plaine had 17,000 residents, and Terrebonne had almost 46,000 residents. This merger made Terrebonne the 10th largest city in Quebec.

Infrastructure

Terrebonne is connected to Montreal's Central Station by commuter rail via the Terrebonne station of the Réseau de transport métropolitain (RTM) Mascouche line.

The city of Terrebonne is also equipped with a bus network, also operated by the RTM, which enables residents to reach several metro stations both in Laval and Montreal, amongst many other locations. Some examples include bus line 30 (or 30G), which brings inhabitants of Terrebonne to the Radisson metro station on Sherbrooke Street East, bus line 19 (or 19G), which reaches Montmorency metro station in Laval, and bus line 25, whose terminal stop is at the Henri-Bourassa metro station.

Demographics 

Ethnicity 

Note: Totals greater than 100% due to multiple origin responses.

Language

Education

University
The Université de Montréal has a small campus located near the Pierre Le Gardeur Hospital in the Lachenaie sector of the city of Terrebonne. There are also some courses given by the Université du Québec à Montréal (UQÀM) in the Terrebonne sector, as well as the Centre universitaire de Lanaudière à Terrebonne affiliated with the Université du Québec à Trois-Rivières (UQTR) located within the Cégep régional de Lanaudière à Terrebonne.

Colleges

Vocational studies
The city of Terrebonne counts several vocational education centres. The Centre de formation professionnelle des moulins is located next to the Cégep régional de Lanaudière à Terrebonne in the Terrebonne sector.

Primary and secondary schools
French-language public schools in Terrebonne Ouest are operated by the Commission scolaire de la Seigneurie-des-Mille-Iles (CSSMI). Additionally, some schools within and serving the city of Terrebonne are operated by the French Commission scolaire des Affluents and the English Sir Wilfrid Laurier School Board.

Commission scolaire des Affluents secondary schools include:
 École secondaire Armand-Corbeil
 École secondaire de l’Odyssée 
 École secondaire Des Rives 
 École secondaire des Trois-Saisons

CSSMI primary schools:
 de l'Espace-Couleurs 
 Jeunes du monde 
 Marie-Soleil-Tougas 
Some CSSMI sections are zoned to École primaire Le Carrefour in Lorraine. The CSSMI secondary schools serving Terrebonne are: École secondaire du Harfang in Sainte-Anne-des-Plaines, École secondaire Hubert-Maisonneuve (lower secondary) in Rosèmere and École secondaire Rive-Nord (upper secondary) in Bois-des-Filion.

Private Francophone secondary schools include:
 Collège Saint-Sacrement

Anglophone public schools serving Terrebonne include:
 McCaig Elementary School in Rosemère serves western Terrebonne
 Pinewood Elementary School in Mascouche serves a central portion
 Franklin Hill Elementary School in Repentigny serves an eastern portion
 Rosemere High School (all areas) in Rosemere

Monuments and historic sites

Île-des-moulins

The pre-industrial complex of the Île-des-moulins was amongst the most important ones in the province of Quebec during the 19th century. Although several infrastructures have degraded, a total of five buildings remain. The fourth lord of Terrebonne, Abbot Louis Lepage, had ordered the construction of the first flour mill in 1721 as well as the first saw mill around 1725.

In 1803, the bakery was built and established in the village. The actual saw and flour mills were built in 1804 and 1846, respectively. Four years following the construction of the flour mill that is currently standing at the Île-des-moulins to this day, the Moulin neuf (New Mill) was built in 1850. In addition, around the same time in 1850, the seigniory office was established.

In 1973, the Île-des-moulins was classified as a historic site of national interest by the Government of Quebec.

Moulin-Neuf dam 

The Moulin-Neuf dam allows for the flow regulation of the Rivière des Mille Îles, as well as ice accumulation control in the spring.

The first dam at the Île-des-moulins was built in 1721, following the establishment of the very first flour mill. This dam linked the Île-des-moulins to the Ile Saint-Jean, passing through the small Île aux moutons, located midway between the two islands in the Rivière des Mille Îles.

In 1872, the Masson family ordered the construction of a new dam near the location of the current historical one. However, this dam was rebuilt in cement in the year 1890 for reinforcement and increased resilience.

Nearly a century later, in 1972, the owner of the Île-des-moulins decided to destroy the dam with dynamite due to flooding risk. As a result, the dam underwent severe damage, prompting the city of Terrebonne to acquire the island and classify it as a protected historical site in 1973.

In 1979, the Ministère des Richesses naturelles du Québec ordered the reconstruction of the Moulin-Neuf dam, to which a pedestrian walkway is added to allow citizens, visitors, and tourists to walk from the Île-des-moulins to the larger Ile Saint-Jean. This new dam was built a certain distance away from the small Île aux moutons, making the dam significantly longer than the initial ones.

Ecclesiastical architecture 

The actual Saint-Louis-de-France Church in Old Terrebonne (Vieux Terrebonne), near the historical site of the Île-des-moulins, was established in 1878, while the parish was founded in 1723 by Louis Lepage de Sainte-Claire, priest of the diocese of Quebec, parish priest of the Île Jésus, and lord of the Seigniory of Terrebonne. The parish was part of the diocese of Saint-Jérôme.

The current Saint-Louis-de-France Church built around the year 1878, the third since the foundation of the parish, was equipped with a Casavant organ in 1946.

In 1880, parish priest Piché, informally known as the bon monsieur Piché ("Good Mister Piché" in English), exhumed the bodies buried in the basement of the old church in order to place them in the crypt of the new one.

Sister cities
 Vitré (France) 1983

Sports
The Terrebonne Cobras are part of the QJHL.

Notes

References

External links

Terrebonne's official site (French only)

See also
Saint Pierre River (Mascouche), a river
Mascouche River, a river
Rivière des Mille Îles, a river

 
Cities and towns in Quebec
1647 establishments in the French colonial empire
Canada geography articles needing translation from French Wikipedia